Dinerchtein is a surname. Notable people with the surname include:

Alexandre Dinerchtein (born 1980), Russian Go player
Viacheslav Dinerchtein (born 1976), violist